The Marske Pioneer is a family of American, single-seat, mid-wing, tailless gliders that was designed by Jim Marske. The Pioneer II version was available as plans and in kit form from Marske Aircraft Corporation for amateur construction.

Design and development
The first Pioneer began as an aircraft construction project of Walt MacFarlane in 1965, but he did not complete the aircraft. The partially completed project was purchased by Bill Daniels and Jim Marske in 1967, who completed it and first flew the aircraft in 1968. That prototype, serial number 1, registered N7910 was still registered to Daniels in 2011.

In its original configuration the Pioneer had a  wingspan. The aircraft was constructed with a wood and doped fabric wing, with the fuselage made from steel tube and fiberglass. The design features a fixed monowheel landing gear, flaps for glide-path control and spoilers for roll control instead of the more usual ailerons.

The original design was simplified for homebuilt construction, retaining the wood and fabric wing construction, but the fuselage was changed to a fiberglass structure. Unlike on the original design, roll control was changed to ailerons, with upper surface spoilers paired with lower surface dive brakes for glidepath control. Because the aircraft is tailless the centre of gravity range is very narrow. To simplify weight and balance considerations the monowheel landing gear is located on the desired C of G and the pilot's seat is adjustable fore-and-aft. The pilot simply moves the seat until the aircraft balances on the wheel to ensure that the balance is within the center-of-gravity range.

Starting in 1972 the Pioneer II was made available as plans or as a kit. The kit included a pre-made fiberglass fuselage shell. Reported building times range from 600 to 2000 hours. At least one Pioneer II was modified with a  wingspan.

Marske has built a prototype Pioneer III, an all-composite variant of the basic design. The Pioneer III is intended to be  lighter than the Pioneer II, produce a 20% drag reduction and be optimized for flight in weak lift conditions.

Operational history

In March 2011 there were seven Pioneer IIs registered in the US, along with the original Pioneer IA and the prototype Pioneer 3. In March 2011 there were four Pioneer IIs registered in Canada.

Variants
Pioneer I
Original model,  wingspan
Pioneer IA
Original model with extended  wingspan
Pioneer II
Redesigned model for home-building, with  wingspan
Pioneer IIA
root:NACA 23012R; tip:NACA 23010R, with short canopy.
Pioneer IIB
root:NACA 33012R; tip:NACA 33010R, with a longer canopy.
Pioneer IIC
modified root:NACA 33012R; tip:NACA 33010R sections, with structural refinements and improvements in the cockpit area.
Pioneer IID
Modified Pioneer II with swept vertical tail and a modified wing leading edge, giving a glide ratio of 35:1.

Pioneer III
Improved model with swept tail and all-composite construction and a  wingspan, prototype registered in 2004.

Specifications (Pioneer IIC)

See also

References

External links

Photo of Pioneer II

1960s United States sailplanes
Pioneer
Aircraft first flown in 1968
Tailless aircraft
Mid-wing aircraft